Meadow Falls is one of seven waterfalls on the Murtle River west of Murtle Lake in Wells Gray Provincial Park, east-central British Columbia, Canada.

The waterfall was discovered by Joseph Hunter, a surveyor working for the future Canadian Pacific Railway, on May 26, 1874. Hunter did not name the falls, but he did name the Murtle River and Murtle Lake for his birthplace in Scotland, Milton of Murtle, near Aberdeen. The Meadow Falls name refers to nearby marshes along the otherwise slow-moving Murtle River, a section known as The Stillwater.

Visitors to Meadow Falls are rare because there is no road or trail access and the nearby marshes make cross-country travel difficult.

References

Waterfalls of British Columbia
Wells Gray-Clearwater
Kamloops Division Yale Land District